Acción obrera ('Workers Action') was a weekly socialist newspaper published from Ceuta, Spain. It was likely launched in early 1931. As of 1933, it was still being published.

References

Defunct newspapers published in Spain
Mass media in Ceuta
Publications with year of establishment missing
Publications with year of disestablishment missing
Socialist newspapers
Spanish-language newspapers
Defunct weekly newspapers